Arthur V. Sheridan (1888 – June 20, 1952) was a Bronx Engineer who served as Bronx Borough  Commissioner of Public Works from 1942 to 1952 under Bronx Borough President James J. Lyons and Arterial Coordinator Robert Moses.

Early life
A native of New York City, Sheridan attended the City University of New York and studied engineering at Columbia University.

Public Service Engineering Career
Sheridan Started his career working on a federal engineering project, earning himself presidential commendations from both Herbert Hoover and Franklin D. Roosevelt. In 1934, Sheridan was named Chief Engineer of the Bronx by Bronx Borough President James J. Lyons. In 1942, Lyons appointed him from that position to the position of Bronx Borough Commissioner of Public Works.

Career outside of Public Service
Sheridan served as president of numerous professional and community groups. From 1928 to 1930, he was the president of the New York Society of Professional Engineers. Sheridan was a founding member and from 1937 to 1938 served as the second president of the National Society of Professional Engineers after David B. Steinman. He also served as president of the Bronx Rotary Club. Sheridan also belonged to both the American Legion and the New York Athletic Club.

During World War I, Sheridan served in the American Expeditionary Forces and as a military consultant during World War II.

In addition, Sheridan edited The American Engineer for 15 years, lectured at Yale, and taught engineering at New York University and Manhattan College.

Outside of the engineering field, Sheridan lectured on history and philosophy.

Death
Sheridan died in a car collision on June 20, 1952, en route to pick up his 11-year-old son to drive back to their home in Lake Mohawk, New Jersey, less than two weeks before his retirement as Borough Commissioner of Public Works on July 1.
He is interred in Woodlawn Cemetery in The Bronx.

Legacy
Sheridan Boulevard (originally the Sheridan Expressway) is named after Sheridan. This road is 1.4 miles long and connects the Bruckner and Cross Bronx Expressways in order to provide a route for commercial vehicles, which cannot travel on the Bronx River Parkway. In the late 2010s, the Sheridan Expressway was converted into a boulevard.

In addition to the highway, Sheridan has a scholarship named after him at Manhattan College.

Bibliography
 "Whither Engineering Education?"
 "Three Centuries in the Bronx"
 "Traffic in the Bronx"

References

1888 births
1952 deaths
People from the Bronx
American civil engineers
Engineers from New York City